The women's javelin throw at the 2016 European Athletics Championships took place at the Olympic stadium for the finals and at the Museumplein for qualifying on 7 and 9 July.

Records

Schedule

Results

Qualification

Qualification: 60.00 m (Q) or best 12 performances (q)

Final

References

External links
 amsterdam2016.org, official championship site

Javelin Throw W
Javelin throw at the European Athletics Championships
2016 in women's athletics